Toyota (GB) PLC is the company responsible for sales, marketing, after sales and customer relations for Toyota and Lexus in the UK, and is therefore responsible for all sales, marketing, after sales and customer relations issues nationwide.

Employing approximately 400 people, the company’s headquarters are located at Great Burgh, Surrey. An architectural design competition was launched in 1997 managed by RIBA Competitions  to design the new HQ. Four architect-led design teams were selected from a list of sixteen practices to take part in the competition. The four teams were chosen following a process that involved interviews, presentations and visits to the architects' completed buildings. Richard Sheppard, Robson & Partners, Architects won the competition and two years later construction started on site. The building has gone on to win a number of awards including the British Council for Offices Award 2001 – Commendation.
 
As well as receiving vehicles for sale from Toyota Manufacturing UK, cars arrive via sea at a facility at Portbury, near Bristol.

Sales are handled by a national network of around 200 Toyota Centres.

See also

External links
 

Toyota
British subsidiaries of foreign companies